The 2012 UCLA Bruins baseball team represented the University of California, Los Angeles in the 2012 NCAA Division I baseball season. The team was in the Pac-12 Conference, and played their home games in Jackie Robinson Stadium. John Savage was in his eighth season as head coach. On March 13, 2012, the Bruins participated in the Dodgertown Classic for the third year, defeating USC 7–2 in the non-conference event. The Bruins tied for first in the Pac-12 Conference with Arizona, finishing with a 20–10 conference record. Seven players were picked in the 2012 Major League Baseball draft.

In the post-season, the Bruins performed well in the NCAA Regional and Super Regional rounds, winning 5 straight games. The Bruins defeated Creighton twice and New Mexico once to win the Los Angeles Regional. They then won the Los Angeles Super Regional by defeating TCU in two consecutive games. The team reached the College World Series for the fourth time in program history, beating Stony Brook in the first game. The Bruins lost the next two games to Arizona and Florida State, finishing the season with a 48–16 record.

Previous season
UCLA finished the 2011 regular season as the #1 team in the Pacific-10 Conference with 18 conference wins and 9 losses, and a 35–24 overall record. They lost to UC Irvine in the Los Angeles Regional Finals of the 2011 NCAA Division I baseball tournament.

Roster

Schedule

! style="background:#536895;color:#FFB300;"| Regular Season
|- valign="top" 

|- align="center" bgcolor="#FFE6E6"
| 1 || February 17 ||  || Jackie Robinson Stadium || 1–2 || M. Boyden (1–0) || S. Griggs (0–1) || J. Reed (1) || 1,007 || 0–1 || –
|- align="center" bgcolor="#ccffcc"
| 2 || February 18 || Maryland || Jackie Robinson Stadium || 6–5 || N. Vander Tuig (1–0) || C. Haslup (0–1) || S. Griggs (1) || 927 || 1–1 ||–
|- align="center" bgcolor="#FFE6E6"
| 3 || February 19 || Maryland || Jackie Robinson Stadium || 1–5 || B. Harman (1–0) || Z. Weiss (0–1) || None || 819 || 1–2 || –
|- align="center" bgcolor="#ccffcc"
| 4 || February 21 ||  || Matador Field || 19–7 || Z. Ortiz (1–0) || H. White (0–1) || None || 372 || 2–2 ||–
|- align="center" bgcolor="#FFE6E6"
| 5 || February 24 ||  || Jackie Robinson Stadium || 3–15 ||  T. Blank (3–0) || A. Plutko (0–1) || None || 522 || 2–3 ||–
|- align="center" bgcolor="#ccffcc"
| 6 || February 25 || Baylor || Jackie Robinson Stadium || 9–3 || D. Berg (1–0) || D. Ashby (0–1) || None || 709 || 3–3 ||–
|- align="center" bgcolor="#ccffcc"
| 7 || February 26 || Baylor || Jackie Robinson Stadium || 8–6 || G. Watson (1–0) || D. Newman (0–1) || S. Griggs (2) || 776 || 4–3 ||–
|- align="center" bgcolor="#ccffcc"
| 8 || February 28 ||  || Jackie Robinson Stadium || 9–1 || G. Watson (2–0) || M. Johnson (0–1) || None || 376 || 5–3 ||–
|-

|- align="center" bgcolor="#ccffcc"
| 9 || March 2 ||  || Jackie Robinson Stadium || 5–2 || A. Plutko (1–1) || H. Greenwood (1–2) || S. Griggs (3) || 608 || 6–3 ||–
|- align="center" bgcolor="#ccffcc"
| 10 || March 3 || Sacramento State || Jackie Robinson Stadium || 6–2 || N. Vander Tuig (2–0) || T. Mendonca (2–1) || None || 628 || 7–3 || –
|- align="center" bgcolor="ccffcc"
| 11 || March 4 || Sacramento State || Jackie Robinson Stadium || 11–2 || Z. Weiss (1–1) || Z. Morgan (0–2) || None || 829 || 8–3 ||–
|- align="center" bgcolor="#ccffcc"
| 12 || March 6 ||  || Jackie Robinson Stadium || 4–0 || G. Watson (3–0) || M. Patito (1–1) || None || 365 || 9–3 ||–
|- align="center" bgcolor="#ccffcc"
| 13 || March 9 ||  || Foley Field || 2–0 || A. Plutko (2–1) || A. Wood (3–1) || None || 1,947 || 10–3 ||–
|- align="center" bgcolor="ccffcc"
| 14 || March 10 || Georgia || Foley Field || 7–6 || R. Deeter (1–0) || M. Palazzone (0–1) || S. Griggs (4) || 2,255 || 11–3 || –
|- align="center" bgcolor="ccffcc"
| 15 || March 11 || Georgia || Foley Field || 7–3 || C. Brewer (1–0) || T. Hicks (2–2) || None || 1,967 || 12–3 ||–
|- align="center" bgcolor="#ccffcc"
| 16 || March 13 ||  || Dodger Stadium || 7–2 || G. Watson (4–0) || B. Garcia (1–2) || None || 6,034 || 13–3 ||–
|- align="center" bgcolor="#ccffcc"
| 17 || March 16 ||  || Jackie Robinson Stadium || 6–5 || D. Berg (2–0) || J. Barrett (1–2) || None || 611 || 14–3 ||1–0
|- align="center" bgcolor="#FFE6E6"
| 18 || March 18 || Arizona State || Jackie Robinson Stadium || 3–4 || T. Williams (5–0) || N. Vander Tuig (2–1) || J. Barrett (1) || 929 || 14–4 || 1–1
|- align="center" bgcolor="#ccffcc"
| 19 || March 18 || Arizona State || Jackie Robinson Stadium || 4–2 || G. Watson (5–0) || A. Blackford (0–2) || S. Griggs (5) || 929 || 15–4 || 2–1
|- align="center" bgcolor="#ccffcc"
| 20 || March 23 ||  || Jackie Robinson Stadium || 12–3 || A. Plutko (3–1) || J.D. Leckenby (3–3) || None || 637 || 16–4 ||3–1
|- align="center" bgcolor="#ccffcc"
| 21 || March 24 || Washington State || Jackie Robinson Stadium || 12–3 || D. Berg (3–0) || R. Ochoa (0–1) || None || 720 || 17–4 ||4–1
|- align="center" bgcolor="FFE6E6"
| 22 || March 26 || Washington State || Jackie Robinson Stadium || 4–10 || K. Swannack (2–2) || G. Watson (5–1) || S. Simon (2) || 319 || 17–5 ||4–2
|- align="center" bgcolor="ccffcc"
| 23 || March 30 ||  || Spring Mobile Ballpark || 16–0 || A. Plutko (4–1) || J. Pond (2–4) || None || 2,000 || 18–5 ||5–2
|- align="center" bgcolor="ccffcc"
| 24 || March 31 || Utah || Spring Mobile Ballpark || 9–6 || N. Vander Tuig (3–1) || B. Duke (2–1) || S. Griggs (6) || 1,250 || 19–5 ||6–2
|-

|- align="center" bgcolor="ccffcc"
| 25 || April 1 ||  || Spring Mobile Ballpark || 5–1 || G. Watson (6–1) || T. Vocca (1–3) || None || 478  || 20–5 || 7–2
|- align="center" bgcolor="FFE6E6"
| 26 || April 5 ||  || Jackie Robinson Stadium || 2–6 || || || || || 20–6 || 7–3
|- align="center" bgcolor="FFE6E6"
| 27 || April 6 || Oregon || Jackie Robinson Stadium || 3–8 || || || || || 20–7 || 7–4
|- align="center" bgcolor="ccffcc"
| 28 || April 7 || Oregon || Jackie Robinson Stadium || 8–6 || || || || || 21–7 || 8–4
|- align="center" bgcolor="ccffcc"
| 29 || April 10 ||  || Jackie Robinson Stadium || 4–2 || G. Watson (7–1) || K. Gauna (3–3) || S. Griggs (8) || 871 || 22–7 || 8–4
|- align="center" bgcolor="FFE6E6"
| 30 || April 13 || Arizona || Hi Corbett Field || 3–4 || K. Heyer (6–1) || D. Berg (4–1) || None || 4,080 || 22–8 || 8–5
|- align="center" bgcolor="ccffcc"
| 31 || April 14 || Arizona || Hi Corbett Field || 15–3 || N. Vander Tuig (4–2) || K. Wade (4–1) || None || 2,380 || 23–8 || 9–5
|- align="center" bgcolor="ccffcc"
| 32 || April 15 || Arizona || Hi Corbett Field || 6–2 || Z. Weiss (2–1) || J. Farris (4–2) || None || 2,858 || 24–8 || 10–5
|- align="center" bgcolor="ccffcc"
| 33 || April 17 ||  || Jackie Robinson Stadium || 12–4 || || || || || 25–8 || 10–5
|- align="center" bgcolor="ccffcc"
| 34 || April 20 || Oregon State || Goss Stadium || 4–0 || || || || || 26–8 || 11–5
|- align="center" bgcolor="FFE6E6"
| 35 || April 21 || Oregon State || Goss Stadium || 0–3 || || || || || 26–9 || 11–6
|- align="center" bgcolor="FFE6E6"
| 36 || April 22 || Oregon State || Goss Stadium || 6–7 || || || || || 26–10 || 11–7
|- align="center" bgcolor="ccffcc"
| 37 || April 24 ||  || Jackie Robinson Stadium || 9–3 || || || || || 27–10 || 11–7
|- align="center" bgcolor="FFE6E6"
| 38 || April 27 ||  || Jackie Robinson Stadium || 2–7 || || || || || 27–11 || 11–8
|- align="center" bgcolor="ccffcc"
| 39 || April 28 || Stanford || Jackie Robinson Stadium || 7–4 || || || || || 28–11 || 12–8
|- align="center" bgcolor="FFE6E6"
| 40 || April 29 || Stanford || Jackie Robinson Stadium || 2–7 || || || || || 28–12 || 12–9
|-

|- align="center" bgcolor="ccffcc"
| 41 || May 1 ||  || Blair Field || 2–1 || G. Watson (8–1) || N. Sabo (0–5) || S. Griggs (10) || 1,342 || 29–12 || 12–9
|- align="center" bgcolor="ccffcc"
| 42 || May 5 || Purdue || Jackie Robinson Stadium || 5–1 || || || || || 30–12 || 12–9
|- align="center" bgcolor="ccffcc"
| 43 || May 5 || Purdue || Jackie Robinson Stadium || 3–2 || || || || || 31–12 || 12–9
|- align="center" bgcolor="FFE6E6"
| 44 || May 6 || Purdue || Jackie Robinson Stadium || 11–15 || || || || || 31–13 || 12–9
|- align="center" bgcolor="ccffcc"
| 45 || May 8 ||  || Eddy D. Field Stadium || 6–2 || || || || || 32–13 || 12–9
|- align="center" bgcolor="ccffcc"
| 46 || May 11 ||  || Husky Ballpark || 2–0 || || || || || 33–13 || 13–9
|- align="center" bgcolor="ccffcc"
| 47 || May 12 || Washington || Husky Ballpark || 11–3 || || || || || 34–13 || 14–9
|- align="center" bgcolor="ccffcc"
| 48 || May 13 || Washington || Husky Ballpark || 4–2 || || || || || 35–13 || 15–9
|- align="center" bgcolor="ccffcc"
| 49 || May 15 ||  || Goodwin Field || 6–3 || || || || || 36–13 || 15–9
|- align="center" bgcolor="ccffcc"
| 50 || May 18 || California || Evans Diamond || 7–2 || || || || || 37–13 || 16–9
|- align="center" bgcolor="ccffcc"
| 51 || May 19 || California || Evans Diamond || 8–5 || || || || || 38–13 || 17–9
|- align="center" bgcolor="FFE6E6"
| 52 || May 20 || California || Evans Diamond || 5–6 || || || || || 38–14 || 17–10
|- align="center" bgcolor="ccffcc"
| 53 || May 22 ||  || Cicerone Field || 6–2 || || || || || 39–14 || 17–10
|- align="center" bgcolor="ccffcc"
| 54 || May 25 ||  || Jackie Robinson Stadium || 3–1 || || || || || 40–14 || 18–10
|- align="center" bgcolor="ccffcc"
| 55 || May 26 || USC || Jackie Robinson Stadium || 6–5 || || || || || 41–14 || 19–10
|- align="center" bgcolor="ccffcc"
| 56 || May 27 || USC || Jackie Robinson Stadium || 7–6 || S. Griggs (3–1) || M. Viramontes (1–2) || None || 1,778 || 42–14 || 20–10
|-

|-
! style="background:#536895;color:#FFB300;"| Post-Season
|-

|- align="center" bgcolor="#ccffcc"
| 57 || June 1 || Creighton || Jackie Robinson Stadium || 3–0 || A. Plutko (10–3) || T. Blach (6–6) || None || 1,570 || 43–14 || 1–0
|- align="center" bgcolor="#ccffcc"
| 58 || June 2 || New Mexico || Jackie Robinson Stadium || 7–1 || N. Vander Tuig (9–3) || G. Sanchez (8–3) || None || 1,601 || 44–14 || 2–0
|- align="center" bgcolor="#ccffcc"
| 59 || June 3 || Creighton || Jackie Robinson Stadium || 13–5 || Z. Weiss (3–2) || N. Musec (3–4) || None || 1,291 || 45–14 || 3–0
|-

|- align="center" bgcolor="#ccffcc"
| 60 || June 8 || TCU || Jackie Robinson Stadium || 6–2 || A. Plutko (11–3) || B. Finnegan (4–5) || None || 2,042 || 46–14 || 4–0
|- align="center" bgcolor="#ccffcc"
| 61 || June 9 || TCU || Jackie Robinson Stadium || 4–1 || N. Vander Tuig (10–3) || P. Morrison (9–2) || D. Berg (1) || 2,135 || 47–14 || 5–0
|-

|- align="center" bgcolor="#ccffcc"
| 62 || June 15 || Stony Brook || TD Ameritrade Park || 9–1 || A. Plutko (12–3) || T. Johnson (12–2) || None || 21,662 || 48–14 || 6–0
|- align="center" bgcolor="#FFE6E6"
| 63 || June 17 || Arizona || TD Ameritrade Park || 0–4 || K. Wade (10–3) || N. Vander Tuig (10–4) || None || 19,198 || 48–15 || 6–1
|- align="center" bgcolor="#FFE6E6"
| 64 || June 19 || Florida State || TD Ameritrade Park || 1–4 || S. Sitz (4–3) || Z. Weiss (3–3) || R. Benincasa (16) || 23,409 || 48–16 || 6–2
|-

Rankings

UCLA Bruins in the 2012 MLB Draft
The following members of the UCLA Bruins baseball program were drafted in the 2012 Major League Baseball draft.

References

Ucla Bruins
UCLA Bruins baseball seasons
Pac-12 Conference baseball champion seasons
College World Series seasons
UCLA
UCLA